Phillip Brock (born January 17, 1982) is a former Arena football wide receiver and running back. He was signed by the CenTex Barracudas as an undrafted free agent in 2006. He played college football at Nicholls State University.

Brock was also a member of the Tucson Blaze, Edmonton Eskimos, Peoria Pirates and Toronto Argonauts.

References
 Nicholls State Colonels media guide

External links
Nicholls State bio
Iowa Barnstormers bio
Toronto Argonauts bio

1982 births
Living people
Players of Canadian football from New Orleans
Players of American football from New Orleans
American players of Canadian football
American football wide receivers
Canadian football wide receivers
Nicholls Colonels football players
Edmonton Elks players
Peoria Pirates players
Toronto Argonauts players
Iowa Barnstormers players
Green Bay Blizzard players
CenTex Barracudas players